Eyabi Okie (born June 7, 1999), formerly known as Eyabi Anoma, is an American football defensive end for the Michigan Wolverines. He previously played for Alabama (2018) and UT Martin (2021). He was also one of the highest rated recruits in the 2018 college football recruiting class, ranked No. 3 nationally by USA Today and No. 4 by 247Sports.

Early years and high school career
Okie attended Saint Frances Academy in Baltimore. He was selected by The Baltimore Sun as its Defensive Player of the Year in December 2017. He was also one of the highest rated recruits in the 2018 college football recruiting class, ranked No. 3 nationally by USA Today, No. 4 by 247Sports, and No. 7 by Rivals.com.

College career

Alabama
Okie committed to Alabama in December 2017.  He starred at the Under Armour All-America Game, tallying two sacks. He played at the linebacker position for Alabama in 2018 and received SEC All-Freshmen honors at the end of the season. In July 2019, Alabama newspapers reported that Okie was not attending classes, jeopardizing his ability to participate in the team's preseason training camp. In August, head coach Nick Saban announced that Okie had been dismissed from the university but refused to elaborate further on the reason for the dismissal.

Houston
During the 2020 season, Okie redshirted for Houston. He was unable to play due to NCAA transfer rules. He was dismissed from the Houston program due to "off-field problems."

UT Martin 
Okie then joined UT Martin in 2021. After tallying eight tackles, 4.5 tackles for loss, and 1.5 sacks and blocking a potential game-winning field goal attempt against Austin Peay, he received multiple honors as the Ohio Valley Conference (OVC) Defensive Player of the Week and Newcomer of the Week, and FCS National Defensive Player of the Week. He helped lead the 2021 UT Martin Skyhawks football team to the OVC championship and the second round of the NCAA Division I FCS playoffs. At the end of the season, he was selected to the OVC All-Newcomer team at the outside linebacker position. He received a degree in interdisciplinary studies from UT Martin.

Michigan
In August 2022, Okie transferred to Michigan, enrolling as a graduate student at the university's School of Social Work. 

After the death of his grandmother early in the summer of 2022, Okie rededicated himself and was inspired to transfer to Michigan.
Early in the 2022 season, he changed his surname from "Anoma" to "Okie", intending to recognize his mother who lives in Africa.

References

External links
 Michigan Wolverines bio

1999 births
Living people
American football defensive ends
American football linebackers
Alabama Crimson Tide football players
Michigan Wolverines football players
UT Martin Skyhawks football players
Players of American football from Baltimore